Julia Cuthbert Smith (26 May 1927 – 19 June 1997) was an English television director and producer. She is best known for being the co-creator (along with Tony Holland) of the BBC soap opera EastEnders, also working as a director and the first producer of the series.

Early career 
London-born Smith became involved in television production when she directed the series Suspense in 1962. She went on to direct popular BBC shows such as Z-Cars (in 1962) and Doctor Who (in 1966 and 1967), for which she directed the stories The Smugglers and The Underwater Menace. In 1967 she directed an adaptation of The Railway Children with Jenny Agutter that was successful enough for it to lead to the fondly remembered 1970 film in which Agutter reprised her role of Roberta.

While working on Z Cars she had met Tony Holland, who was a writer for the show. The two of them became an established producer/script-editor team and went on to work for the BBC's long-running hospital drama Angels (1975) from 1979 to 1983.

EastEnders 

In 1983 the BBC contacted Smith and  Holland to create a new popular bi-weekly serial drama. Two ideas were given to them, one about a caravan site, the other about a shopping arcade.  Neither of them liked either of the ideas and demanded to be able to create something about what they knew—in the words of Smith—"London - today!"

Together they came up with the idea of a serial set in the East End of London in a Victorian Square. When casting for the show, Smith had the guideline 'Only genuine Eastenders need apply'; it was this that gave her the idea for the name of the show, which would be called EastEnders after other names were rejected.  Originally the show was to be called Eastenders, but Jonathan Powell, then Head of Drama at the BBC who had commissioned the show, made the tentative suggestion that the second "e" didn't look good on paper, and said that perhaps it should be capitalized.  It was, for which Smith later said "...we were eternally grateful to him!"

Traditionally, the end music to EastEnders begins with dramatic drums, but occasionally, especially when a character departs, a piano introduction is used. This is called Julia's Theme, after Julia Smith.

Her final contribution to EastEnders, along with that of fellow creator Tony Holland, came in early 1989, amid a dispute with BBC bosses as to whether the character of Den Watts (played by Leslie Grantham) could ever return to the show after being shot and supposedly killed. The character would ultimately return to the series, having apparently survived the shooting, but Smith would not live to see this happen.

Eldorado
After the success of EastEnders, Smith and Holland collaborated again on the ill-fated BBC soap opera Eldorado.  Holland created the series — based on an original idea by Verity Lambert—and Smith was producer.  Eldorado was produced by Lambert through her own company Cinema Verity Productions.  The BBC obviously hoped that, after EastEnders, Smith and Holland could make drama gold again; however, the series was cancelled by the new controller of BBC1, Alan Yentob. Smith was blamed for the programme's shortcomings and was fired, which left her bitter towards the BBC, who she believed had not given Eldorado a chance to establish itself. Corinne Hollingworth took over as series producer after Smith left the show, but the series was ended after only one year.

Death
Following the demise of Eldorado, Smith effectively retired from television work but remained active on the lecture circuit, giving talks on TV drama production. She died of cancer in Chelsea, London, in 1997. Several stalwart cast members of EastEnders, including Wendy Richard, attended her funeral.

References

External links

1927 births
1997 deaths
20th-century English screenwriters
20th-century British women writers
BBC television producers
British women television producers
British television producers
Deaths from cancer in England
English television directors
English television producers
English television writers
British women television directors
British women television writers
Writers from London